Garden Culture is a print magazine that covers urban agriculture, (indoor) gardening, gardening techniques, urban gardening projects and design ideas. It was first published in February 2011 in the Netherlands.

History 
Garden Culture Magazine was originally a quarterly print publication for the Dutch market. The first issue debuted in 2011 and expanded to English-speaking countries. Currently, the magazine is being published bi-monthly and distributed internationally to garden stores in the United States, Canada, United Kingdom, Ireland, Australia, and New Zealand.

References

2011 establishments in the Netherlands
Quarterly magazines published in the United States
Quarterly magazines published in the United Kingdom
Magazines published in the Netherlands
Dutch-language magazines
Gardening magazines
Magazines established in 2011
Quarterly magazines published in the Netherlands